Tricked is the fourth novel in  Kevin Hearne's urban fantasy series, The Iron Druid Chronicles and is the sequel to Hammered. It was released on April 24, 2012.

Plot introduction

Being the last Druid carries with it several complications, especially when you become infamous for helping to kill Thor and decimate the Norse pantheon. Now with a whole host of deities hunting him, Atticus O'Sullivan, along with his faithful dog Oberon, and initiate Granuaile, decide to leave his Third Eye Books and Herbs occult shop in Tempe and go into hiding, with the help of Coyote, the Navajo trickster god, who asks a favor in return. Yet, deals with Coyote aren't always what they seem and if Atticus can survive faking his own death he'll have to contend with undead skinwalkers and a vampire blood feud that threatens to engulf all of Arizona.

The novel blends elements of mythology and urban fantasy.

Characters
 Atticus O'Sullivan: The last of the Druids.
 Oberon: Irish Wolfhound; he can communicate telepathically with Atticus.
 Coyote: Navajo Trickster god.
 Granuaile: Atticus' Druid initiate.
 Frank Chischilly: Hataali, Navajo medicine man.
 Sophie Betsuie: Head engineer for Navajo construction project. 
 Hel: Daughter of Loki, Norse goddess of death, ruler of Hel.
 Leif Helgarson:  Atticus' nighttime lawyer who is also a vampire.
 The Morrigan: Celtic Chooser of the Slain and goddess of war.
 Hallbjörn “Hal” Hauk: Atticus’ daytime lawyer who is also a werewolf.

References 

2012 American novels
Urban fantasy novels
Del Rey books